Mary Qayuaryuk (April 25, 1908 – June 7, 1982), also known as Kudjuakjuk, was an Inuit printmaker and midwife. She settled in Cape Dorset in 1966 after living off the land. She was the first woman elected to the Cape Dorset Community Council and between 1966 and 1982 she worked with the West Baffin Eskimo Co-operative. She was married to Kopapik "A" and three of her daughters also became artists, Qaunaq Mikkigak, Sheokjuke Toonoo, and Laisa Qayuaryuk.

Her work was focused on animals, and owls and other birds in particular. Her work is included in the collections of the National Gallery of Canada, and the Portland Art Museum. She had exhibits at The Innuit Gallery of Eskimo Art, Winnipeg Art Gallery, Inuit Gallery of Vancouver, Arctic Artistry, Feheley Fine Arts, and the Frye Art Museum among others.

Her granddaughter, Ovilu Tunnillie (1949–2014) was an Inuit sculptor.

References

1908 births
1982 deaths
20th-century Canadian artists
20th-century Canadian women artists
Inuit artists
20th-century printmakers
20th-century Canadian printmakers
Women printmakers
People from Kinngait
Artists from Nunavut
Bird artists
Canadian midwives